Wanneroo is an electoral district of the Legislative Assembly in the Australian state of Western Australia.

The district is located in the northern suburbs of Perth.

Wanneroo is a marginal seat; it has been held by the government of the day on every occasion since its creation in 1989.

Geography
Wanneroo is based in the outer northern suburbs of Perth. It includes the suburbs of Ashby, Banksia Grove, Carramar, Gnangara, Hocking, Jandabup, Madeley, Mariginiup, Pearsall, Sinagra, Tapping, Wangara and Wanneroo.

History
Wanneroo was first created for the 1989 state election. It replaced the abolished seat of Joondalup, and was won by Labor MP Jackie Watkins, then the member for Joondalup. Watkins lost the seat one term later when Labor lost government at the 1993 state election. The seat remained in Liberal Party hands for two terms until the party lost government at the 2001 state election. This pattern asserted itself again at the 2008 state election when Labor's two term hold on the seat ended with the defeat of the Labor government.

Members for Wanneroo

Election results

References

External links
 ABC election profiles: 2005 2008
 WAEC district maps: current boundaries, previous distributions

Wanneroo
Constituencies established in 1989
1989 establishments in Australia